is a Japanese voice actress from Kyoto Prefecture. She is a member of the singing unit Milky Holmes Feathers, formed with fellow voice actress Aimi for the media franchise Tantei Opera Milky Holmes. 

She plays keyboardist Arisa Ichigaya in the band-based anime series BanG Dream!.

Career
Itō was a junior high school student when she tried out some dub recording at NHK Studio Park. She decided to become a voice actresses when she received praise for her dubs. She quit doing high school activities in 2013 to study acting, and applied on April 27 for the "Milky Holmes Sisters Members Scout Audition". The audition had a field of 2,000 applicants, Itō was chosen from these people to play the role of Alice Myojingawa as well as be part of a sextet called the "Milky Holmes Sisters". Itō grew up in Kyoto but commuted to Tokyo where she worked, she finally moved there in early 2015 after her high school graduation then attended college.

On April 10, 2020, Itō, Aimi, and Mikoi Sasaki started their own YouTube channel under the name of the Three Voice Acting Sisters [Team Y]. In a video posted in October 2020, Itō and the two others stated that they wished for their YouTube channel to be detailed in their Wikipedia pages.

Filmography

Anime

Video games

Audio drama

References

External links 
  
  
 
  

1996 births
Living people
Japanese video game actresses
Japanese voice actresses
Starlight 99-gumi members
Voice actresses from Kyoto
21st-century Japanese actresses